Assens station or Assens railway station could refer to:

 Assens station (Denmark), a former railway station in Assens, Denmark
 Assens railway station (Switzerland), a railway station in Assens, Switzerland